The 2004 Minnesota Democratic caucuses were held on March 2 in the U.S. state of Minnesota as one of the Democratic Party's statewide nomination contests ahead of the 2004 presidential election.

Results

References

Minnesota
Democratic primary
2004